Zolotukhinsky District is an administrative and municipal district (raion), one of the twenty-eight in Kursk Oblast, Russia. It is located in the north of the oblast. Its administrative center is the urban locality (a work settlement) of Zolotukhino. Population:  26,800 (2002 Census);  The population of Zolotukhino accounts for 21.2% of the district's total population.

Geography
Zolotukhinsky District is located in the north central region of Kursk Oblast, on the border with Oryol Oblast.  The terrain is hilly plain; the district lies on the Orel-Kursk plateau of the Central Russian Upland.  The main river in the district is the Tuskar River, a tributary of the Seym River and part of the Dnieper River Basin.  The district is 20 km northeast of the city of Kursk, and 420 km southwest of Moscow.  The area measures 44 km (north-south), and 40 km (west-east); total area of 1,150 km2 (3.7% of Kursk Oblast).

The district is bordered on the north by Ponyrovsky District and a portion of Oryol Oblast, on the east by Shchigrovsky District, on the south by Belovsky District, and on the west by Fatezhsky District.

References

Notes

Sources

External links
Zolotukhinsky District on Google Maps
Zolotukhinsky District on OpenStreetMap

Districts of Kursk Oblast